Kevin Rapley (born 21 September 1977) is an English footballer. After playing for several Football League and non-league clubs, Rapley is now playing for Witton Albion.

Career
The striker began his career with Brentford as an apprentice, going on to make 51 Football League appearances for them. He later played in the league for Southend United (loan), Notts County, Exeter City (loan), Scunthorpe United and Colchester United, before joining Football Conference side Chester City in July 2003. His first season at the club ended with Chester winning the title and promotion back to the League, where he played for one more season (but part of it was spent on loan at Forest Green Rovers). Unfortunately, he struggled to land a regular place in the Chester side throughout his time at the club and had a relatively poor scoring record, meaning it came as no surprise when he was released by the club in 2005.

Rapley's 2005–06 season started well but petered out through the season, which ended with Droylsden losing to Stafford Rangers in the Conference North play-off final on penalties. In February 2007, he signed for Leigh RMI, where he helped them avoid relegation from the Conference North at the end of 2006–07.

In October 2007, after 12 goals from 32 appearances at Leigh, Rapley moved to Barrow, who were also struggling in the Conference North. The fans at Barrow reacted positively to the move, believing Rapley's wealth of experience would lift them up the table and he enhanced his reputation by scoring in a 1–1 draw with Football League One side AFC Bournemouth in the FA Cup First Round in November 2007.

On 3 January 2008, Rapley joined Vauxhall Motors on loan to gain match practice. The following month he joined Witton Albion on a permanent basis.

Honours

Club
Brentford
 Football League Division Three Winner (1): 1998–99

Chester City
 Football Conference Winner (1): 2003–04

External links

References

1977 births
Living people
Sportspeople from Reading, Berkshire
English footballers
Brentford F.C. players
Southend United F.C. players
Notts County F.C. players
Exeter City F.C. players
Scunthorpe United F.C. players
Colchester United F.C. players
Chester City F.C. players
Forest Green Rovers F.C. players
Droylsden F.C. players
English Football League players
Leigh Genesis F.C. players
Barrow A.F.C. players
Vauxhall Motors F.C. players
Association football midfielders
National League (English football) players
Witton Albion F.C. players